The African Security Review is the quarterly journal of the Institute for Security Studies (ISS). It provides a regular forum for the dissemination of research findings and information through the publication of research reports, policy papers and articles on security and related issues in sub-Saharan Africa. The journal was previously published as the African Defence Review (1994) and the Southern African Defence Review (1992–1993).

External links
  (fulltext selected issues)

African studies
Publications established in 1992